The 6th Korfball World Championship was held in Adelaide (Australia) in July 1999, with the participation of 12 national teams.

First round

Final round

Final ranking

See also
Korfball World Championship
International Korfball Federation

External links
International Korfball Federation

Korfball World Championship
Korfball World Championship
IKF World Korfball Championship
International sports competitions hosted by Australia
Korfball in Australia